Cantigas do Maio (English: "Songs of May") is the fifth studio album by Portuguese singer-songwriter José Afonso. It was released in December 1971 by Portuguese label Orfeu.

It is widely considered the best of Afonso's career and one of the all-time greatest albums of Portuguese music. It contains Afonso's most iconic song, "Grândola, Vila Morena", which was used as a radio-broadcast signal by the Portuguese Armed Forces Movement during their military coup operation in the morning of 25 April 1974, which led to the Carnation Revolution and the transition to democracy in Portugal.

Recording 
Cantigas do Maio was recorded between 11 October and 4 November 1971 at the Strawberry Studio in Château d'Hérouville, in Hérouville, France.

Release 
The album was released in Portugal during the Christmas season of 1971. It was re-released in CD and vinyl, and made available for the first time on streaming platforms, in April 2022.

Legacy 
In 1978, the Portuguese weekly-magazine SETE awarded Cantigas do Maio the "Award for Greatest Album Ever of Portuguese Folk Music" (Prémio Melhor Disco de Sempre da Música Popular Portuguesa).

In 2009, Portuguese music magazine Blitz named Cantigas do Maio the greatest Portuguese album of the 1970s, in a list ranking the best Portuguese albums of the past four decades.

Track listing 
All songs written by José Afonso, except where noted.

Personnel 
Credits are adapted from the album's inner notes.

 José Afonso – vocals
 Carlos Correia (Bóris) – guitar, chorus, steps
 Michel Delaporte – darbuka, Berber bongo, tumbas, Brazilian tamborim, adufe
 Christian Padovan – bass guitar
 Tony Branis – trumpet
 Jacques Granier – flute
 Francisco Fanhais – chorus, steps, whistles, Jew's harp
 José Mário Branco – chorus, steps, accordion, Hammond organ, Fender piano

Production

 José Mário Branco – arrangements, musical direction
 Gilles Sallé – recording, mixing
 Christian Gence – recording, mixing
 José Santa-Bárbara – cover, graphic design
 Patrick Ulmann – photography

Charts

References 

1971 albums
Portuguese-language albums
José Afonso albums